Colleran is a surname. Notable people with the surname include:

Brendan Colleran (born 1948), Irish Gaelic football player
Enda Colleran (1942–2004), Irish Gaelic football manager
Ger Colleran, Irish journalist
Mandy Colleran, British actress
Noel Colleran (born 1944), Irish Gaelic football player